Amguri Assembly constituency is one of the 126 assembly constituencies in Sivasagar District of  Assam a north east state of India. Amguri is also part of Jorhat Lok Sabha constituency.

Members of Legislative Assembly

 1951: Rabin Kakoti, Indian National Congress.
 1957: Khagendranath Borborua, Independent.
 1962: Khagen Borbarua, Revolutionary Communist Party of India.
 1967: Puspadhar Chaliha, Indian National Congress.
 1972: Puspadhar Chaliha, Indian National Congress.
 1978: Khagen Borbarua, Revolutionary Communist Party of India.
 1983: Kirti Dutta, Indian National Congress.
 1985: Prodip Hazarika, Asom Gana Parishad.
 1991: Anjan Dutta, Indian National Congress.
 1996: Prodip Hazarika, Asom Gana Parishad.
 2001: Anjan Dutta, Indian National Congress.
 2006: Prodip Hazarika, Asom Gana Parishad.
 2011: Anjan Dutta, Indian National Congress.
 2016: Prodip Hazarika, Asom Gana Parishad.
 2021: Prodip Hazarika, Asom Gana Parishad.

Election results

2016 results

2011 results

2006 results

See also

 Amguri
 List of constituencies of Assam Legislative Assembly

References

External links 
 

Assembly constituencies of Assam
Jorhat district